JJ is a Japanese fashion and lifestyle magazine published by Kobunsha. It was established in 1975 as an extra issue of Josei Jishin, and was the first women's magazine for college students in Japan. Most readers of JJ are females between the ages of 17 and 26, and range from college students to office workers.

JJ advises its readers to dress conservatively. It uses many professional fashion models, however the models it uses are not necessarily under exclusive contract with JJ. The model Ryoko Tanami is frequently featured in Classy, a version of JJ targeted to women aged between 24 and 28.

JJ Bis is a version of JJ magazine for older teens.

Models featured in JJ

Current
References

 Nicole (ja)
 Ai Okawa
 Karen Fujii
 Miwako Kakei
 Mayuko Arisue
 Lisa Kikukawa (ja)
 Kako Kondō
 Hirona Yamazaki
 Erina Mano
 Yuna Kawaguchi
 Hina Higuchi (ja)
 Mizuho Habu
 Ayaka Takamoto (ja)

Past

 Ema Asō
 Reira Aoyama (ja)
 Reira Arai (ja)
 Miki Arimura (ja)
 Akiko Ikeda
 Ayumi Katrina (ja)
 Saemi Ikeda (ja)
 Yuko Ito
 Nami Iwasaki (ja)
 Manami Ui
 Ayumi Uehara (ja)
 Mami Uematsu (ja)
 Anna Umemiya
 Alisa Uerahama (ja)
 Ari Ōta (ja)
 Minami Otomo (ja)
 Audrey Ayaka (ja)
 Saori Ochiai (ja)
 Yukari Obata (ja)
 Rie Ono (ja)
 Chikako Kaku (ja)
 Chieko Kuroda (ja)
 Nana Katase
 Natsuki Katō
 Eri Kaneko (ja)
 Ranko Kanbe
 Yuki Kubota (ja)
 Christina (ja)
 Meisa Kuroki
 Tomoe Genzaki (ja)
 Sari Kobayashi (ja)
 Keito Kondō (ja)
 Yuriko Sakaki (ja)
 Kura Kobayashi (ja)
 Yumi Sakurai (ja)
 Mayumi Shiina
 Risako Miura (ja)
 Mami Shimamura (ja)
 Aki Shimizu (ja)
 Yumi Sugimoto
 Karen Takizawa
 Noriko Toyama
 Yukari Sonohara (ja)
 Sonomi Takigawa (ja)
 Reiko Takagaki 
 Ryōko Takahashi
 Saya Tajima (ja)
 Ryoko Tanami
 Akemi Darenogare
 Tomomi Tsunoda (ja)
 Devin
 Manami Teramoto (ja)
 Reiko Tokita 
 Mitsuho Nakamura (ja)
 Mariya Nagao
 Natsumi (ja)
 Nanami (ja)
 Yuka Nanjo (ja)
 Miho Nishimura (ja)
 Anna Nose (ja)
 Hiroko Hatano
 Aki Higashihara
 Vivianne Ono (ja)
 Risa Hirako
 Fala Chen
 Shuuka Fujii 
 Eriko Fujimoto (ja)
 Norika Fujiwara
 Brenda (ja)
 Juri Matsuda (ja)
 Maya Alina
 Keiko Mayama (ja)
 Marie Klabin
 Marion
 Mie (ja)
 Emiri Miyasaka
 Mai Yamazashi (ja)
 Haruko Yamada (ja)
 Yuumi (ja)
 Towako Kimijima (ja)
 Hinano Yoshikawa
 Loveli
 Liza Kennedy
 Rina (ja)
 Rinka
 Marianna Watari

References

External links
  
 Mikeware-Mags JJ magazine cover archive

1975 establishments in Japan
Fashion magazines published in Japan
Monthly magazines published in Japan
Women's magazines published in Japan
Kobunsha
Magazines established in 1975
Women's fashion magazines
Youth magazines